Blackheath College may refer to:
 Blackheath and Thornburgh College, in Charters Towers, Queensland, Australia, a merger of Blackheath College and Thornburgh College
 Eltham College, in London, England, formerly known as Blackheath College